An egg cup or eggcup, sometimes called an egg server, is an item of tableware used for serving and holding boiled eggs within their shell. Egg cups have an upwardly concave portion to hold the egg and a flat-bottomed base. Egg cups can be made from a variety of materials, including bakelite, glass, plastic, porcelain, pottery, various metals, wood, or a combination of two materials, such as ceramic and wood.

History

An early silver egg cup was found in the ruins of Pompeii.

As collectors' items 
Egg cups are collectible items. Collecting egg cups is called pocillovy.

See also
 Coddled egg

References

Further reading
 Javad Hashemi. 1998. The Joy of Collecting Egg Cups, 1998 

Serving vessels